Winchester Films was a British production company. It was started in March 1993 and was listed on the Alternative Investment Market to raise the capital needed to build an effective portfolio of films and TV programmes. In the late 1990s and the early part of the 21st Century, Winchester Films acquired produced many British films and acquired distribution rights to films from other countries. It also expanded into the US, setting up an office in Los Angeles in order to make connections with the Hollywood crowd. This led to Winchester Films being granted distribution rights to Heartbreakers (the UK's largest distribution deal - $53 million).

In July 2003, the company acquired Cobalt Media who added their portfolio to that of Winchester's. In March 2004, the company was taken over by ContentFilms Inc and the name was officially changed from Winchester Films to ContentFilm. ContentFilm is no longer listed on the AIM market in London.

Winchester Films produced
 Tales Not Told (2005)
 The Crocodile Hunter: Collision Course (2002)
 One Night (2002)
 Last Orders (2001)
 Another Life (2001)
 Wild About Harry (2000)
 Greenfingers (2000)
 Throw Down (2000)
 Lighthouse (film) (2000)
 Captain Jack (1999)
 The Sea Change (1998)
 Shooting Fish (1997)
 Clockwork Mice (1995)

Distributed films
 Shade (2003)
 Slap Her... She's French (2002)
 Heartbreakers (2001)
 Soul Assassin (2001)
 Greenfingers (2000)
 Honest (2000)
 Palmer's Pick Up (1999)
 Vol-au-vent (1996)

Film production companies of the United Kingdom
Mass media companies established in 1993
Companies formerly listed on the Alternative Investment Market